Steyning railway station was on the Steyning Line which served the small market town of Steyning.

Station opening and development

The arrival of the station accelerated residential development in the area and some houses were constructed by the railway contractor to the west of the station. Workshops constructed by the contractor survived as industrial units until their demolition after 1953. In addition to passengers, the station's main traffic was animals, notably horses, for the Wednesday cattle market in "Market Field".

The single-track line was doubled by 1879.

In 1912 the station master appointed by the LBSCR was Charles Holden, father of the past President of the Bluebell Railway Bernard Holden who also lived at the station-master's house.

Closed

The station closed as a result of the Beeching Axe in 1966 and was demolished soon after closure. The site is now occupied by the new alignment of the A283 Steyning-by-pass. 
Only the old warehouse building (view building), long since converted into townhouses remains of the station today aside from the name "Station Road".

See also 

 List of closed railway stations in Britain

References 

Disused railway stations in West Sussex
Railway stations in Great Britain opened in 1861
Railway stations in Great Britain closed in 1966
Beeching closures in England
Steyning
1861 establishments in England
Former London, Brighton and South Coast Railway stations